Events in the year 1725 in Norway.

Incumbents
Monarch: Frederick IV

Events
8 March – The Dutch merchant ship Akerendam sinks near the island of Runde during its maiden voyage, the entire ship's crew of 200 people dies in the sinking.

Arts and literature
The construction of the Oslo Ladegård is complete.

Births

11 February – Johan Frederik Classen, industrialist and philanthropist (died 1792).
8 March – Jens Boalth, educator (died 1780).
22 September – Gunder Gundersen Hammer, government official (died 1772).
19 November – Magnus Theiste, government official (died 1791)

Deaths

See also

References